Teston Bridge is a road bridge across the River Medway, between Teston and West Farleigh in Kent, England.

History

The bridge was constructed in the 14th or 15th century and comprises six arches of various heights and widths, the middle three of which span the river.

Three of the arches were rebuilt at the beginning of the 19th century and the parapet may also have been rebuilt. The bridge is a Grade I listed building and a scheduled ancient monument.

Description
Teston Bridge is built of coursed rag-stone with ashlar capping stones to the parapets. The bridge is narrow, only wide enough to permit traffic to pass in one direction at a time and the parapets feature pedestrian refuges continued up from the cutwaters on each side. It carries the B2163 road, which is crossed on the level by the Medway Valley Line just west of the bridge.

See also
Grade I listed buildings in Maidstone
List of scheduled monuments in Maidstone

References

Borough of Maidstone
Grade I listed buildings in Kent
Scheduled monuments in Kent
Bridges in Kent
Road bridges in England
Grade I listed bridges